This is a list of the National Register of Historic Places listings in Scotts Bluff County, Nebraska.

This is intended to be a complete list of the properties and districts on the National Register of Historic Places in Scotts Bluff County, Nebraska, United States.  The locations of National Register properties and districts for which the latitude and longitude coordinates are included below, may be seen in a map.

There are 21 properties and districts listed on the National Register in the county, including 2 National Historic Landmarks.

Current listings

|}

See also

 List of National Historic Landmarks in Nebraska
 National Register of Historic Places listings in Nebraska

References

Scotts Bluff
 
Buildings and structures in Scotts Bluff County, Nebraska